Ultimatum is a 1938 French historical drama film directed by Robert Wiene and Robert Siodmak and starring Dita Parlo, Erich von Stroheim and Abel Jacquin. The film's plot is set in 1914 against the backdrop of the July Crisis between the assassination of Archduke Franz Ferdinand and the beginning of the First World War. It focuses on the relationship between a Serbian officer and his Austrian-born wife and their involvement in espionage between the countries.

It was the final film of Wiene, who had been a leading director of German cinema particularly noted for his work on expressionist films during the silent era. He died shortly before the film's completion, and it was finished by Siodmak.

Production and reception
Wiene had been forced into exile from Germany following the Nazi rise to power. During the four years since his previous film A Night in Venice (1934) he had been struggling to raise financing in London and Paris for his projects and had not made a single film. The film was based on the novel Days Before the Storm by Ewald Bertram. The film's title refers to the Austrian ultimatum issued to Serbia shortly before the outbreak of war.

Because of the film's casting of Parlo and von Stroheim and its war-theme, it drew comparisons with Jean Renoir's La Grande Illusion (1937).

Cast

References

Bibliography
 Jung, Uli & Schatzberg, Walter. Beyond Caligari: The Films of Robert Wiene. Berghahn Books, 1999.

External links

1938 films
1930s historical drama films
1930s spy drama films
French spy drama films
French historical drama films
1930s French-language films
Films directed by Robert Wiene
Films set in Belgrade
Films set in Vienna
Films set in 1914
Films based on German novels
French black-and-white films
1938 drama films
1930s French films